The South Carolina Research Authority (SCRA) was chartered in 1983 by the South Carolina General Assembly as a public, non-profit corporation, SCRA fosters South Carolina's Innovation Economy by supporting entrepreneurs, enabling academic research and its commercialization, and connecting industry to innovators.

SCRA's entrepreneurial program, SC Launch is an economic development program that is intended to help early-stage companies to commercialize innovations and create jobs. SC Launch was recognized by Forbes as one of the leading state-based economic development programs in the US. 

In support its mission, SCRA builds and manages research facilities that include wet labs, secure rooms for sensitive work, and advanced, high-tech manufacturing shops.

Leadership
Bob Quinn is the executive director.

SCRA History
In 1983 the South Carolina General Assembly made a one-time grant of $500,000 and 1,400 acres of undeveloped land to form SCRA. SCRA has been self-sustaining since its inception, relying on mostly on fees earned on the applied research programs it creates and leads. SCRA affiliate SC Launch receives $6 million annually under the Industry Partners Fund, which provides working capital seed grants to new technology companies in accordance with SCRA's economic development mission. Donations to the Industry Partners Fund are good for a 100 percent, dollar-for-dollar credit against state taxes. Since 2006, SC Launch has received $30 million total from the Industry Partners Fund.

SCRA is exempt from income, sales and property taxes under its enabling legislation.

References

External links
 South Carolina Research Authority
 SC Launch

Organizations based in South Carolina
Research organizations in the United States